

Events

Pre-1600
 461 – Libius Severus is declared emperor of the Western Roman Empire. The real power is in the hands of the magister militum Ricimer.
 636 – The Rashidun Caliphate defeats the Sasanian Empire at the Battle of al-Qādisiyyah in Iraq.
1493 – Christopher Columbus goes ashore on an island called Borinquen he first saw the day before. He names it San Juan Bautista (later renamed again Puerto Rico).

1601–1900
1794 – The United States and the Kingdom of Great Britain sign Jay's Treaty, which attempts to resolve some of the lingering problems left over from the American Revolutionary War.
1802 – The Garinagu arrive at British Honduras (present-day Belize).
1808 – Finnish War: The Convention of Olkijoki in Raahe ends hostilities in Finland.
1816 – Warsaw University is established.
1847 – The second Canadian railway line, the Montreal and Lachine Railroad, is opened.
1863 – American Civil War: U.S. President Abraham Lincoln delivers the Gettysburg Address at the dedication ceremony for the military cemetery at Gettysburg, Pennsylvania.
1881 – A meteorite lands near the village of Grossliebenthal, southwest of Odessa, Ukraine.
1885 – Serbo-Bulgarian War: Bulgarian victory in the Battle of Slivnitsa solidifies the unification between the Principality of Bulgaria and Eastern Rumelia.

1901–present
1911 – The Doom Bar in Cornwall claims two ships, Island Maid and Angele, the latter killing the entire crew except the captain.
1912 – First Balkan War: The Serbian Army captures Bitola, ending the five-century-long Ottoman rule of Macedonia.
1916 – Samuel Goldwyn and Edgar Selwyn establish Goldwyn Pictures.
1941 – World War II: Battle between HMAS Sydney and HSK Kormoran. The two ships sink each other off the coast of Western Australia, with the loss of 645 Australians and about 77 German seamen.
1942 – World War II: Battle of Stalingrad: Soviet Union forces under General Georgy Zhukov launch the Operation Uranus counterattacks at Stalingrad, turning the tide of the battle in the USSR's favor.
  1942   – Mutesa II is crowned the 35th and last Kabaka (king) of Buganda, prior to the restoration of the kingdom in 1993.
1943 – Holocaust: Nazis liquidate Janowska concentration camp in Lemberg (Lviv), western Ukraine, murdering at least 6,000 Jews after a failed uprising and mass escape attempt.
1944 – World War II: U.S. President Franklin D. Roosevelt announces the sixth War Loan Drive, aimed at selling US$14 billion in war bonds to help pay for the war effort.
  1944   – World War II: Thirty members of the Luxembourgish resistance defend the town of Vianden against a larger Waffen-SS attack in the Battle of Vianden.
1946 – Afghanistan, Iceland and Sweden join the United Nations.
1950 – US General Dwight D. Eisenhower becomes Supreme Commander of NATO-Europe.
1952 – Greek Field Marshal Alexander Papagos becomes the 152nd Prime Minister of Greece.
1954 – Télé Monte Carlo, Europe's oldest private television channel, is launched by Prince Rainier III.
1955 – National Review publishes its first issue.
1967 – The establishment of TVB, the first wireless commercial television station in Hong Kong.
1969 – Apollo program: Apollo 12 astronauts Pete Conrad and Alan Bean land at Oceanus Procellarum (the "Ocean of Storms") and become the third and fourth humans to walk on the Moon.
  1969   – Association football player Pelé scores his 1,000th goal.
1977 – TAP Air Portugal Flight 425 crashes in the Madeira Islands, killing 131.
1979 – Iran hostage crisis: Iranian leader Ayatollah Ruhollah Khomeini orders the release of 13 female and black American hostages being held at the US Embassy in Tehran.
1984 – San Juanico disaster: A series of explosions at the Pemex petroleum storage facility at San Juan Ixhuatepec in Mexico City starts a major fire and kills about 500 people.
1985 – Cold War: In Geneva, U.S. President Ronald Reagan and Soviet Union General Secretary Mikhail Gorbachev meet for the first time.
  1985   – Pennzoil wins a US$10.53 billion judgment against Texaco, in the largest civil verdict in the history of the United States, stemming from Texaco executing a contract to buy Getty Oil after Pennzoil had entered into an unsigned, yet still binding, buyout contract with Getty.
  1985   – Police in Baling, Malaysia, lay siege to houses occupied by an Islamic sect of about 400 people led by Ibrahim Mahmud.
1988 – Serbian communist representative and future Serbian and Yugoslav president Slobodan Milošević publicly declares that Serbia is under attack from Albanian separatists in Kosovo as well as internal treachery within Yugoslavia and a foreign conspiracy to destroy Serbia and Yugoslavia.
1994 – In the United Kingdom, the first National Lottery draw is held. A £1 ticket gave a one-in-14-million chance of correctly guessing the winning six out of 49 numbers.
1996 – A Beechcraft 1900 and a Beechcraft King Air collide at Quincy Regional Airport in Quincy, Illinois, killing 14.
1998 – Clinton–Lewinsky scandal: The United States House of Representatives Judiciary Committee begins impeachment hearings against U.S. President Bill Clinton.
1999 – Shenzhou 1: The People's Republic of China launches its first Shenzhou spacecraft.
  1999   – John Carpenter becomes the first person to win the top prize in the TV game show Who Wants to Be a Millionaire?.
2004 – The worst brawl in NBA history results in several players being suspended. Several players and fans are charged with assault and battery.
2010 – The first of four explosions takes place at the Pike River Mine in New Zealand. Twenty-nine people are killed in the nation's worst mining disaster since 1914.
2013 – A double suicide bombing at the Iranian embassy in Beirut kills 23 people and injures 160 others.
2022 – A gunman kills five and injures 17 at Club Q, a gay nightclub in Colorado Springs, Colorado.

Births

Pre-1600
1417 – Frederick I, Count Palatine of Simmern (d. 1480)
1464 – Emperor Go-Kashiwabara of Japan (d. 1526)
1503 – Pier Luigi Farnese, Duke of Parma (d. 1547)
1563 – Robert Sidney, 1st Earl of Leicester, English poet and politician (d. 1626)
1600 – Charles I of England, Scotland, and Ireland (d. 1649)
  1600   – Lieuwe van Aitzema, Dutch historian and diplomat (d. 1669)

1601–1900
1617 – Eustache Le Sueur, French painter and educator (d. 1655)
1700 – Jean-Antoine Nollet, French priest and physicist (d. 1770)
1711 – Mikhail Lomonosov, Russian physicist, chemist, astronomer, and geographer (d. 1765)
1722 – Leopold Auenbrugger, Austrian physician (d. 1809)
  1722   – Benjamin Chew, American lawyer and judge (d. 1810)
1752 – George Rogers Clark, American general (d. 1818)
1765 – Filippo Castagna, Maltese politician (d. 1830)
1770 – Bertel Thorvaldsen, Danish sculptor and academic (d. 1844)
1802 – Solomon Foot, American lawyer and politician (d. 1866)
1805 – Ferdinand de Lesseps, French diplomat and engineer, developed the Suez Canal (d. 1894)
1808 – Janez Bleiweis, Slovenian journalist, physician, and politician (d. 1881)
1812 – Karl Schwarz, German theologian and politician (d. 1885)
1828 – Rani Lakshmibai, Indian queen (d. 1858)
1831 – James A. Garfield, American general, lawyer, and politician, 20th President of the United States (d. 1881)
1833 – Wilhelm Dilthey, German psychologist, sociologist, and historian (d. 1911)
1834 – Georg Hermann Quincke, German physicist and academic (d. 1924)
1843 – Richard Avenarius, German-Swiss philosopher and academic (d. 1896)
  1843   – C. X. Larrabee, American businessman (d. 1914)
1845 – Agnes Giberne, Indian-English astronomer and author (d. 1939)
1859 – Mikhail Ippolitov-Ivanov, Russian composer, conductor, and educator (d. 1935)
1862 – Billy Sunday, American baseball player and evangelist (d. 1935)
1873 – Elizabeth McCombs, the first woman elected to the Parliament of New Zealand (d. 1935)
1875 – Mikhail Kalinin, Russian civil servant and politician, 1st Head of State of The Soviet Union (d. 1946)
1876 – Tatyana Afanasyeva, Russian-Dutch mathematician and theorist (d. 1964)
1877 – Giuseppe Volpi, Italian businessman and politician, founded the Venice Film Festival (d. 1947)
1883 – Ned Sparks, Canadian-American actor and singer (d. 1957)
1887 – James B. Sumner, American chemist and academic, Nobel Prize laureate (d. 1955)
1888 – José Raúl Capablanca, Cuban-American chess player and theologian (d. 1942)
1889 – Clifton Webb, American actor, singer, and dancer (d. 1966)
1892 – Thomas Clay, English footballer and coach (d. 1949)
  1892   – Huw T. Edwards, Welsh poet and politician (d. 1970)
1893 – René Voisin, French trumpet player (d. 1952)
1894 – Américo Tomás, Portuguese admiral and politician, 14th President of Portugal (d. 1987)
1895 – Louise Dahl-Wolfe, American photographer (d. 1989)
  1895   – Evert van Linge, Dutch footballer and architect (d. 1964)
1897 – Quentin Roosevelt, American lieutenant and pilot (d. 1918)
1898 – Klement Jug, Slovenian philosopher and mountaineer (d. 1924)
  1898   – Arthur R. von Hippel, German-American physicist and academic (d. 2003)
1899 – Abu al-Qasim al-Khoei, Iranian religious leader and scholar (d. 1992)
  1899   – Allen Tate, American poet and critic (d. 1979)
1900 – Bunny Ahearne, Irish-English ice hockey player and manager (d. 1985)
  1900   – Mikhail Lavrentyev, Russian mathematician and hydrodynamicist (d. 1980)
  1900   – Anna Seghers, German author and politician (d. 1983)

1901–present
1901 – Nina Bari, Russian mathematician (d. 1961)
1904 – Nathan Freudenthal Leopold, Jr., American murderer (d. 1971)
1905 – Eleanor Audley, American actress (d. 1991)
  1905   – Tommy Dorsey, American trombonist, composer and bandleader (d. 1956)
1906 – Franz Schädle, German SS officer (d. 1945)
1907 – Jack Schaefer, American author (d. 1991)
  1907   – Hans Liska, Austrian-German artist (d. 1983)
1909 – Peter Drucker, Austrian-American theorist, educator, and author (d. 2005).
  1909   – Carlos López Moctezuma, Mexican actor (d. 1980).
1910 – Adrian Conan Doyle, English race car driver, author, and explorer (d. 1970)
1912 – Bernard Joseph McLaughlin, American bishop (d. 2015)
  1912   – George Emil Palade, Romanian-American biologist and physician, Nobel Prize laureate (d. 2008)
  1912   – Robert Simpson, American meteorologist and author (d. 2014)
1915 – Earl Wilbur Sutherland, Jr., American pharmacologist and biochemist, Nobel Prize laureate (d. 1974)
1917 – Indira Gandhi, Indian politician, Prime Minister of India (d. 1984)
1919 – Gillo Pontecorvo, Italian director and screenwriter (d. 2006)
  1919   – Alan Young, English-Canadian actor, singer, and director (d. 2016)
  1919   – Lolita Lebrón, Puerto Rican nationalist (d. 2010) 
1920 – Gene Tierney, American actress and singer (d. 1991)
1921 – Roy Campanella, American baseball player and coach (d. 1993)
  1921   – Peter Ruckman, American pastor and educator (d. 2016)
1922 – Salil Chowdhury, Indian director, playwright, and composer (d. 1995)
  1922   – Yuri Knorozov, Ukrainian-Russian linguist, epigrapher, and ethnographer (d. 1999)
  1922   – Rajko Mitić, Serbian footballer and coach (d. 2008)
1923 – Louis D. Rubin, Jr., American author, critic, and academic (d. 2013)
1924 – Jane Freilicher, American painter and poet (d. 2014)
  1924   – William Russell, English actor
  1924   – Knut Steen, Norwegian-Italian sculptor (d. 2011)
  1924   – Margaret Turner-Warwick, English physician and academic (d. 2017)
1925 – Zygmunt Bauman, Polish-English sociologist, historian, and academic (d. 2017)
1926 – Jeane Kirkpatrick, American academic and diplomat, 16th United States Ambassador to the United Nations (d. 2006)
  1926   – Pino Rauti, Italian journalist and politician (d. 2012)
  1926   – Barry Reckord, Jamaican playwright and screenwriter (d. 2011)
1928 – Dara Singh, Indian wrestler, actor, and politician (d. 2012)
1929 – Norman Cantor, Canadian-American historian and scholar (d. 2004)
1930 – Kurt Nielsen, Danish tennis player, referee, and sportscaster (d. 2011)
1932 – Eleanor F. Helin, American astronomer (d. 2009)
1933 – Larry King, American journalist and talk show host (d. 2021)
  1933   – Jerry Sheindlin, American judge and author
1934 – Kurt Hamrin, Swedish footballer and scout
  1934   – Valentin Ivanov, Russian footballer and manager (d. 2011)
  1934   – David Lloyd-Jones, English conductor (d. 2022)
1935 – Rashad Khalifa, Egyptian-American biochemist and scholar (d. 1990)
  1935   – Jack Welch, American engineer, businessman, and author (d. 2020)
1936 – Dick Cavett, American actor and talk show host
  1936   – Ray Collins, American singer (d. 2012)
  1936   – Yuan T. Lee, Taiwanese-American chemist and academic, Nobel Prize laureate
1937 – Penelope Leach, English psychologist and author
1938 – Len Killeen, South African rugby league player (d. 2011)
  1938   – Frank Misson, Australian cricketer
  1938   – Ted Turner, American businessman and philanthropist, founded Turner Broadcasting System
1939 – Emil Constantinescu, Romanian academic and politician, 3rd President of Romania
  1939   – Tom Harkin, American lawyer and politician
  1939   – Jane Mansbridge, American political scientist and academic
  1939   – Warren "Pete" Moore, American singer-songwriter and record producer (d. 2017)
  1939   – Richard Zare, American chemist and academic
1940 – Gary Gruber, author and expert on test-prep (d. 2019)
1941 – Denny Doherty, Canadian singer-songwriter (d. 2007)
  1941   – Dan Haggerty, American actor and producer (d. 2016)
  1941   – Tommy Thompson, American captain and politician, 19th United States Secretary of Health and Human Services
1942 – Roland Clift, English engineer and academic
  1942   – Larry Gilbert, American golfer (d. 1998)
  1942   – Calvin Klein, American fashion designer, founded Calvin Klein Inc.
  1942   – Sharon Olds, American poet and academic
1943 – Fred Lipsius, American saxophonist and educator
  1943   – Aurelio Monteagudo, Cuban-American baseball player and manager (d. 1990)
1944 – Agnes Baltsa, Greek soprano and actress
  1944   – Dennis Hull, Canadian ice hockey player and sportscaster
  1945   – Hans Monderman, Dutch engineer (d. 2008)
1945 – Bobby Tolan, American baseball player and manager
1947 – Bob Boone, American baseball player and manager
  1947   – Anfinn Kallsberg, Faroese politician, 10th Prime Minister of the Faroe Islands
  1947   – Lamar S. Smith, American lawyer and politician
1949 – Raymond Blanc, French chef and author
  1949   – Ahmad Rashad, American football player and sportscaster
1950 – Peter Biyiasas, Greek-Canadian chess player
1951 – Charles Falconer, Baron Falconer of Thoroton, Scottish lawyer and politician, Lord High Chancellor of Great Britain
1953 – Robert Beltran, American actor
  1953   – Tom Villard, American actor (d. 1994)
1954 – Abdel Fattah el-Sisi, Egyptian field marshal and politician, 6th President of Egypt
  1954   – Réjean Lemelin, Canadian ice hockey player and coach
  1954   – Kathleen Quinlan, American actress
1955 – Sam Hamm, American screenwriter and producer
1956 – Peter Carter, English diplomat, British Ambassador to Estonia (d. 2014)
  1956   – Eileen Collins, American colonel, pilot, and astronaut
  1956   – Ann Curry, Guamanian-American journalist
  1956   – Glynnis O'Connor, American actress
  1956   – Sergiy Vilkomir, Ukrainian-born computer scientist (d. 2020)
1957 – Ofra Haza, Israeli singer-songwriter and actress (d. 2000)
  1957   – Tom Virtue, American actor
1958 – Isabella Blow, English magazine editor (d. 2007)
  1958   – Algirdas Butkevičius, Lithuanian sergeant and politician, 12th Prime Minister of Lithuania
  1958   – Terrence C. Carson, American actor and singer
  1958   – Annette Gordon-Reed, American historian, author, and academic
  1958   – Charlie Kaufman, American director, producer, and screenwriter
  1958   – Michael Wilbon, American sportscaster and journalist
1959 – Robert Barron, American bishop, author, and theologian
  1959   – Jo Bonner, American politician
  1959   – Allison Janney, American actress 
1960 – Miss Elizabeth, American wrestler and manager (d. 2003)
  1960   – Matt Sorum, American drummer, songwriter, and producer 
1961 – Jim L. Mora, American football player and coach
  1961   – Meg Ryan, American actress and producer
  1961   – Pernille Svarre, Danish athlete
1962 – Jodie Foster, American actress, director, and producer
  1962   – Sean Parnell, American lawyer and politician, 12th Governor of Alaska
  1962   – Dodie Boy Peñalosa, Filipino boxer and trainer 
1963 – Terry Farrell, American actress
  1963   – Jon Potter, English-American field hockey player
1964 – Fred Diamond, American-English mathematician and academic
  1964   – Vincent Herring, American saxophonist and flute player
  1964   – Phil Hughes, Irish footballer and coach
  1964   – Jung Jin-young, South Korean actor
  1964   – Irina Laricheva, Russian target shooter (d. 2020)
  1964   – Eric Musselman, American basketball player and coach
  1964   – Nicholas Patrick, English-American engineer and astronaut
  1964   – Peter Rohde, Australian footballer and coach
  1964   – Tony Ryall, New Zealand banker and politician, 38th New Zealand Minister of Health
  1964   – Ronnie Sinclair, Scottish footballer and coach
  1964   – Alfredo Zaiat, Argentine economist and journalist
  1964   – Shawn Holman, American baseball pitcher
1965 – Laurent Blanc, French footballer and manager
  1965   – Douglas Henshall, Scottish actor
  1965   – Jason Pierce, English singer-songwriter and guitarist
  1965   – Paulo S. L. M. Barreto, Brazilian cryptographer and academic
  1965   – Paul Weitz, American actor, director, producer, screenwriter, and playwright
1966 – Shmuley Boteach, American rabbi and author
  1966   – Gail Devers, American sprinter and hurdler
  1966   – Rocco DiSpirito, American chef and author
  1966   – Kakhaber Kacharava, Georgian footballer and manager
  1966   – Jason Scott Lee, American actor and martial artist
1967 – Yaroslav Blanter, Russian physicist
  1967   – Randi Kaye, American journalist
1969 – Philippe Adams, Belgian race car driver
  1969   – Erika Alexander, American actress and screenwriter
  1969   – Ertuğrul Sağlam, Turkish footballer and coach
  1969   – Richard Virenque, Moroccan-French cyclist and sportscaster
1971 – Saleemah Abdul-Ghafur, American author and activist
  1971   – Justin Chancellor, English bass player
  1971   – Jeremy McGrath, American motorcycle racer
  1971   – Alice Peacock, American singer-songwriter
  1971   – Tony Rich, American R&B singer-songwriter and musician 
1972 – Sandrine Holt, English-American model and actress
1973 – Billy Currington, American singer-songwriter and guitarist
  1973   – Savion Glover, American dancer and choreographer
1975 – Toby Bailey, American basketball player and agent
  1975   – Sushmita Sen, Indian actress, model and Miss Universe 1994
1976 – Jack Dorsey, American businessman, co-founded Twitter
  1976   – Robin Dunne, Canadian actor, producer, and screenwriter
  1976   – Jun Shibata, Japanese singer-songwriter
  1976   – Petr Sýkora, Czech ice hockey player
  1976   – Stylianos Venetidis, Greek footballer and manager
1977 – Kerri Strug, American gymnast and runner
1978 – Dries Buytaert, Belgian computer programmer
  1978   – Matt Dusk, Canadian singer
  1978   – Věra Pospíšilová-Cechlová, Czech discus thrower and shot putter
1979 – Keith Buckley, American singer-songwriter 
  1979   – Mahé Drysdale, New Zealand rower
  1979   – John-Ford Griffin, American baseball player
  1979   – Ryan Howard, American baseball player
  1979   – Larry Johnson, American football player
  1979   – Leam Richardson, English footballer and manager
1980 – Courtney Anderson, American football player
  1980   – Otis Grigsby, American football player
  1980   – Vladimir Radmanović, Serbian basketball player
1981 – Marcus Banks, American basketball player
  1981   – André Lotterer, German race car driver 
  1981   – Juan Martín Fernández Lobbe, Argentine rugby player
  1981   – DJ Tukutz, South Korean DJ, producer, and songwriter 
  1981   – Mark Wallace, Welsh-English cricketer
1983 – Chandra Crawford, Canadian skier
  1983   – Adam Driver, American actor
  1983   – Daria Werbowy, Polish-Canadian model
1984 – Dawid Kucharski, Polish footballer
  1984   – Brittany Maynard, American activist (d. 2014)
1985 – Chris Eagles, English footballer
  1985   – Alex Mack, American football player
1986 – Sam Betty, English rugby player
  1986   – Jeannie Ortega, American singer-songwriter, dancer, and actress
  1986   – Michael Saunders, Canadian baseball player
  1986   – Jessicah Schipper, Australian swimmer
  1986   – Milan Smiljanić, Serbian footballer
1987 – Sílvia Soler Espinosa, Spanish tennis player
1988 – Timo Eichfuss, Estonian basketball player
  1988   – Patrick Kane, American ice hockey player
1989 – John McCarthy, Australian footballer (d. 2012)
  1989   – Roman Sergeevich Trofimov, Russian ski jumper
  1989   – Tyga, American rapper
1990 – Marquise Goodwin, American football player
  1990   – John Moore, American ice hockey player
  1990   – Benedikt Schmid, German footballer
1991 – Marina Marković, Serbian basketball player
  1991   – Fabien Antunes, French footballer
1992 – Cameron Bancroft, Australian cricketer
1993 – Kerim Frei, Austrian footballer
  1993   – Suso, Spanish footballer
1994 – Ibrahima Mbaye, Senegalese footballer
1995 – Vanessa Axente, Hungarian model
1997 – Kotonowaka Masahiro, Japanese sumo wrestler
1997 – The McCaughey septuplets
1999 – Evgenia Medvedeva, Russian figure skater

Deaths

Pre-1600
 496 – Pope Gelasius I
 498 – Pope Anastasius II
 930 – Yan Keqiu, Chinese chief strategist
1034 – Theodoric II, Margrave of Lower Lusatia (b. c. 990)
1092 – Malik-Shah I, Seljuk Sultan (b. 1055)
1288 – Rudolf I, Margrave of Baden-Baden (b. 1230)
1298 – Mechtilde, Saxon saint (b. c. 1240)
1350 – Raoul II of Brienne, Count of Eu (b. 1315)
1481 – Anne de Mowbray, 8th Countess of Norfolk (b. 1472)
1557 – Bona Sforza, Italian wife of Sigismund I the Old (b. 1494)
1577 – Matsunaga Hisahide, Japanese daimyō (b. 1508)
1581 – Tsarevich Ivan Ivanovich of Russia (b. 1554)

1601–1900
1630 – Johann Hermann Schein, German singer and composer (b. 1586)
1649 – Caspar Schoppe, German scholar and author (b. 1576)
1665 – Nicolas Poussin, French-Italian painter (b. 1594)
1672 – John Wilkins, English bishop and philosopher (b. 1614)
1679 – Roger Conant, Massachusetts governor (b. 1592)
1692 – Thomas Shadwell, English poet and playwright (b. 1642)
1703 – Man in the Iron Mask, French prisoner
1723 – Antoine Nompar de Caumont, French courtier and soldier (b. 1632)
1772 – William Nelson, American politician, Colonial Governor of Virginia (b. 1711)
1773 – James FitzGerald, 1st Duke of Leinster, Irish soldier and politician (b. 1722)
1785 – Bernard de Bury, French harpsichord player and composer (b. 1720)
1798 – Wolfe Tone, Irish general (b. 1763)
1804 – Pietro Alessandro Guglielmi, Italian composer (b. 1728)
1810 – Jean-Georges Noverre, French dancer and choreographer (b. 1727)
1822 – Johann Georg Tralles, German mathematician and physicist (b. 1763)
1828 – Franz Schubert, Austrian pianist and composer (b. 1797)
1831 – Titumir, Bengali revolutionary (b. 1782)
1850 – Richard Mentor Johnson, American colonel, lawyer, and politician, 9th Vice President of the United States (b. 1780)
1868 – Ivane Andronikashvili, Georgian general (b. 1798)
1883 – Carl Wilhelm Siemens, German-English engineer (b. 1823)
1887 – Emma Lazarus, American poet (b. 1849)
1897 – William Seymour Tyler, American historian and academic (b. 1810)

1901–present
1910 – Wilhelm Rudolph Fittig, German chemist (b. 1835)
1915 – Joe Hill, Swedish-born American labor activist (b. 1879)
1918 – Joseph F. Smith, American religious leader, 6th President of The Church of Jesus Christ of Latter-day Saints (b. 1838)
1924 – Thomas H. Ince, American actor, director, producer, and screenwriter (b. 1880)
1928 – Jeanne Bérangère, French actress (b. 1864) 
1931 – Xu Zhimo, Chinese poet and translator (b. 1897)
1938 – Lev Shestov, Ukrainian-Russian philosopher and theologian (b. 1866)
1942 – Bruno Schulz, Polish painter and critic (b. 1892)
1943 – Miyagiyama Fukumatsu, Japanese sumo wrestler, the 29th Yokozuna (b. 1895)
1949 – James Ensor, Belgian painter (b. 1860)
1950 – Aage Redal, Danish actor (b. 1891)
1954 – Walter Bartley Wilson, English footballer and manager (b. 1870)
1955 – Marquis James, American journalist and author (b. 1891)
1956 – Francis L. Sullivan, English-American actor (b. 1903)
1959 – Joseph Charbonneau, Canadian archbishop (b. 1892)
1960 – Phyllis Haver, American actress (b. 1899)
1962 – Grigol Robakidze, Georgian author, poet, and playwright (b. 1880)
1963 – Carmen Boni, Italian-French actress (b. 1901) 
  1963   – Henry B. Richardson, American archer (b. 1889)
1967 – Charles J. Watters, American priest and soldier, Medal of Honor recipient (b. 1927)
1968 – May Hollinworth, Australian theatre producer and director (b. 1895)
1970 – Lewis Sargent, American actor (b. 1903)
  1970   – Maria Yudina, Soviet pianist (b. 1899)
1974 – George Brunies, American trombonist (b. 1902)
  1974   – Louise Fitzhugh, American author and illustrator (b. 1928)
1975 – Roger D. Branigin, American colonel, lawyer, and politician, 42nd Governor of Indiana (b. 1902)
  1975   – Rudolf Kinau, Low German writer (b. 1887)
  1975   – Elizabeth Taylor (novelist), English novelist, (b. 1912)
1976 – Basil Spence, Indian-Scottish architect and academic, designed the Coventry Cathedral (b. 1907)
1983 – Tom Evans, English singer-songwriter and guitarist (b. 1947)
1985 – Stepin Fetchit, American actor, singer, and dancer (b. 1902)
  1985   – Juan Arvizu, Mexican lyric opera tenor and bolero vocalist (b. 1900)
1988 – Christina Onassis, American-Greek businesswoman (b. 1950)
  1988   – Peggy Parish, American author (b. 1927)
1989 – Grant Adcox, American race car driver (b. 1950)
1990 – Sun Li-jen, Chinese general and politician (b. 1900)
1991 – Reggie Nalder, Austrian-American actor (b. 1907)
1992 – Bobby Russell, American singer-songwriter (b. 1940)
  1992   – Diane Varsi, American actress (b. 1938)
1998 – Ted Fujita, Japanese-American meteorologist and academic (b. 1920)
  1998   – Alan J. Pakula, American director, producer, and screenwriter (b. 1928)
  1998   – Bernard Thompson, English director and producer (b. 1926)
1999 – Alexander Liberman, Russian-American artist and publisher (b. 1912)
2001 – Marcelle Ferron, Canadian painter and stained glass artist (b. 1924)
2003 – Ian Geoghegan, Australian race car driver (b. 1939)
2004 – George Canseco, Filipino journalist and composer (b. 1934)
  2004   – Piet Esser, Dutch sculptor and academic (b. 1914)
  2004   – Helmut Griem, German actor and director (b. 1932)
  2004   – Trina Schart Hyman, American author and illustrator (b. 1939)
  2004   – Terry Melcher, American singer-songwriter and producer (b. 1942)
  2004   – John Vane, English pharmacologist and academic, Nobel Prize laureate (b. 1927)
2005 – Erik Balling, Danish director, producer, and screenwriter (b. 1924)
  2005   – Steve Belichick, American football player, coach and scout (b. 1919)
2007 – Kevin DuBrow, American singer-songwriter (b. 1955)
  2007   – Mike Gregory, English rugby player and coach (b. 1964)
2009 – Johnny Delgado, Filipino actor (b. 1948)
2010 – Pat Burns, Canadian ice hockey player and coach (b. 1952)
2011 – Ömer Lütfi Akad, Turkish director and screenwriter (b. 1916)
  2011   – John Neville, English actor (b. 1925)
  2011   – Ruth Stone, American poet and author (b. 1915)
2012 – John Hefin, Welsh director and producer (b. 1941)
  2012   – Shiro Miya, Japanese singer-songwriter (b. 1943)
  2012   – Warren Rudman, American lawyer and politician (b. 1930)
  2012   – Boris Strugatskiy, Russian author (b. 1933)
2013 – Babe Birrer, American baseball player (b. 1928)
  2013   – Dora Dougherty Strother, American pilot and academic (b. 1921)
  2013   – Ray Gosling, English journalist, author, and activist (b. 1939)
  2013   – Frederick Sanger, English biochemist and academic, Nobel Prize laureate (b. 1918)
  2013   – Charlotte Zolotow, American author and poet (b. 1915)
2014 – Roy Bhaskar, English philosopher and academic (b. 1944)
  2014   – Jeremiah Coffey, Irish-Australian bishop (b. 1933)
  2014   – Pete Harman, American businessman (b. 1919)
  2014   – Richard A. Jensen, American theologian, author, and academic (b. 1934)
  2014   – Gholam Hossein Mazloumi, Iranian footballer and manager (b. 1950)
  2014   – Mike Nichols, German-American actor, director, producer, and screenwriter (b. 1931)
2015 – Armand, Dutch singer-songwriter (b. 1946)
  2015   – Allen E. Ertel, American lawyer and politician (b. 1937)
  2015   – Ron Hynes, Canadian singer-songwriter and guitarist (b. 1950)
  2015   – Korrie Layun Rampan, Indonesian author, poet, and critic (b. 1953)
  2015   – Mal Whitfield, American runner and diplomat (b. 1924)
2017 – Charles Manson, American cult leader and mass murderer (b. 1934)
  2017   – Warren "Pete" Moore, American singer-songwriter and record producer (b. 1938)
  2017   – Jana Novotná, Czech tennis player (b. 1968)
  2017   – Della Reese, American singer and actress (b. 1931)
  2017   – Mel Tillis, American singer and songwriter (b. 1932)
  2022   – Jason David Frank, American actor and mixed martial artist, best known as Tommy Oliver in the Power Rangers franchise (b. 1973)

Holidays and observances
 Christian feast day:
 Obadiah (Eastern Catholic Church)
 Raphael Kalinowski
 Severinus, Exuperius, and Felician
 November 19 (Eastern Orthodox liturgics)
 Day of Discovery of Puerto Rico (Puerto Rico)
 Day of Missile Forces and Artillery (Russia, Belarus)
 Flag Day (Brazil)
 Garifuna Settlement Day (Belize)
 International Men's Day
 Liberation Day (Mali)
 Martyrs' Day (Uttar Pradesh, India) 
 The Sovereign Prince's Day (Monaco)
 Women's Entrepreneurship Day
 World Toilet Day

References

External links

 
 
 

Days of the year
November